Grimsby Minster is a minster and parish church located in Grimsby, North East Lincolnshire, England. Dedicated to St James, the church belongs to the Church of England and is within the Diocese of Lincoln.

Background
In 1114, an existing religious building was transferred to Robert Bloet, the Bishop of Lincoln. The following years he supervised many renovations and developments to the building, resulting in St James, a church containing a nave with six bays. The central tower was added in 1365. In 1586 St James became the parish church of Grimsby, after John Whitgift united the parishes of St James and St Mary's. The parish church of the latter had been located on Victoria Street.

In 1856 Canon Ainslie began a complete restoration of St James, which included lengthening the chancel and the rebuilding of the South transept. Later works included the installation of new windows with stone tracery, and the installation of new oak roofs. The next key event in the history of the church, was the opening of the James College in 1883. The predecessor of today's St James' School, it was founded by Canon Young. It was the only choir school in the UK to be attached to a parish church until the restructuring of the choir in September 2013 by Anthony Pinel, opening membership of the choir to boys and girls from any local school.

The news that the church was to be granted minster status was announced in the Grimsby Telegraph on 15 April 2010. The Minster-making ceremony took place on Sunday, 16 May 2010 and was led by the Lord Bishop of Lincoln, and the Bishop of Grimsby. The Mayor of North East Lincolnshire, Councillor John Colebrook, accepted the official declaration of Minster status on behalf of the Borough.

Parish structure
The Parish of Grimsby,St Mary and St James and St Hugh includes one other church:
St Hugh's Church, Grimsby
This was built as a 'daughter church' of St James. The two churches form one parish with one Parochial church council.
Until 31 August 2022, the Parish contained two other 'daughter churches', St Martin's and St Mark's. On 1 September 2022 these two churches were created into the new parish of Grimsby, St Mark's and St Martin's.

Organ

The church has two pipe organs. The West End Organ is by J. W. Walker & Sons Ltd and dates from 1951, built to replace an earlier instrument destroyed by enemy action during World War II. Parts of the pre-war instrument were incorporated within the new organ, notably soundboards and some pedal pipes. A specification and pictures of the organ can be see on the National Pipe Organ Register. The Walker organ was rebuilt by J. W. Walker in 1976, with significant tonal modifications being made at this time.

Given the significant distance between the West End of the Church and the Choir, a second organ was installed on the North Side of the Choir in the 1970s, by Johnson. This two manual and pedal instrument is used for choral services to accompany the Choir. The specification and photographs of this instrument, too, can be found on the National Pipe Organ Register.

Organists

Former organists include
Edwin Brammer ca. 1872
James Forbes Carter ca. 1896
John Stanley Robson 1924 – 1953
Eric Arthur Conningsby 1954 – 1955 (formerly organist of Llandaff Cathedral)
Dennis Townhill 1956 – 1961
Martin How 1961 – 1964
Michael Dudman 1964 – 1968
Robert Walker 1968 – 1973
Christopher Weaver 1974 – 1979
Andrew Brade 1979 - 1981
Patrick Larley 1982 – 1987
Andrew Shaw 1987 – 1993
Andrew Cantrill 1994 – 1996
Steven Maxson 1997 – 2003
Adrian Roberts 2003 – 2006
Anthony Pinel 2006 – 2014
Steven Maxson 2014 - 2021

Assistant organists
E Charles Hopkins 1956 – c1958
Philip Cave 1968–1971
Anthony Marwood 1971-
Andrew Brade 1977 - 1979
Stephen Maltby 1979 – 1982
Barry Whitfield 1991 – 2006
Steven Maxson 2006 – 2014
Stefano Golli 2014 - 2018

Choir 

Grimsby Minster was known for being the only parish church in England to have its own choir school, St James' School. The school was founded in 1880 as St James' Choir School by Canon James Peter Young to educate choirboys and it is now a co-educational school of the Alpha Group.

Since September 2013, instituted by organist Anthony Pinel, choristers have been drawn from across the county of North East Lincolnshire and, in his successor's time, beyond and membership of the choir is open to girls as well as boys.

A major recruitment drive is currently under way in order to restore the minster choir to its former glory, still as a truly inclusive group open to all who would benefit from the musical education offered.  The current Director of Music, Mark Wilde, is working with delivery partners 'Choral Humber' and 'North East Lincs Music Hub' to engage with potential young singers in primary schools and academies across North East Lincolnshire.

Bells

The Minster has 10 bells hung for normal full-circle ringing. They weigh a total of 4.3 tonnes, the tenor (the largest bell) weighing 18.25cwt and having a diameter of 4 feet. They are tuned to the key of E flat. They date from 1830 when three of them were cast by William Dobson, and several bellfounders have cast the rest since then, including John Taylor & Co and John Warner & Sons, the newest bells (the two lightest) being cast in 1962 by Mears and Stainbank. Frank Kennington (born 26 December 1933) was taught to ring at the Minster in 1945 by his father and became Tower Captain in 1955. He gave up the post in 2012 after 57 years because the stairs leading to the ringing room were getting too much for him.

References

External links

 Photographs of Grimsby Parish Church
 Grimsby Parish Church group on Flickr

Church of England church buildings in Lincolnshire
Churches in Grimsby
Grade I listed churches in Lincolnshire